Paris Exposition, 1900 was a series of seventeen short French silent actuality films made in 1900 by Georges Méliès. The series was a documentary record of the 1900 Exposition Universelle in Paris.

Summary

Main series

The following list includes the original French title and the English release title (note that English-language catalogs preceded each title with the series name and a dash, e.g. Paris Exposition, 1900—The Moving Sidewalk), as well the numbers assigned to the films in Méliès's Star Film Company catalogs.

Related films
In addition to the Paris Exposition, 1900 series proper, Méliès also sold two films, filmed on the River Seine in 1899, showing pre-opening work progressing on Exposition buildings on both sides of the river. These two films were released separately in France but were sold together as a continuous film (numbered 232–233) in English-speaking catalogs. Like the main series, these films were each 20 meters long.

Production
Méliès traveled at least twice to the Paris Exposition for his shots, filming architectural views early in the exposition year and shots of the ongoing exposition later on. He employed various techniques to achieve his views, shooting variously from stationary vantage points, from the Exposition's moving sidewalk, from the River Seine, and from an electric train. The circular panoramas of the Palais des Beaux Arts, Les Invalides, the Champs de Mars, Trocadéro, and the Pont d'Iéna were made by placing the camera on a specially built Gaumont turning platform.

Though unconnected to Méliès's enterprise, another early filmmaker, the Edison Manufacturing Company producer James Henry White, also filmed scenes from the Exposition in July 1900. White's camera was equipped with a newly designed panning-head tripod, allowing for numerous panoramas from stationary vantage points.

Status
The Méliès scholar John Frazer reported in 1979 that the Paris Exposition, 1900 series survived in a private collection, but a 2008 Méliès filmography prepared by Jacques Malthête labels all seventeen films, as well as the two earlier films showing work in progress, to be presumed lost.

References

Films directed by Georges Méliès
1900 films
French silent short films
Articles containing video clips
French black-and-white films
Exposition Universelle (1900)